Philadelphia Songs is an album by Denison Witmer. It was recorded at his home in Philadelphia and at Soundgun Studios. It was released in the United States on Burnt Toast Vinyl on September 24, 2002, and in Europe on Bad Taste Records on April 19, 2004.

Track listing
 "Sets of Keys" - 3:27
 "I Won't Let You Down" - 4:22
 "24 Turned 25" - 2:06
 "Leaving Philadelphia (Arriving in Seattle)" - 3:13
 "Chestnut Hill" - 4:50
 "Stations" - 4:14
 "Do I Really Have To?" - 2:37
 "Remember the Things You Have Seen" - 3:02
 "Saint Cecilla (Ode to Music)" - 3:20

Personnel
 Denison Witmer - vocals, guitar, producer, engineer
 The Six Parts Seven - producer, guest musicians
 Scott French - producer, engineer
 Edan Cohen - mixer, engineer

2002 albums
Denison Witmer albums